Ffaldybrenin is a village in Llanycrwys community formed around the parish church in Carmarthenshire, Wales. In the late 19th century Church and State separated but the same area is now represented as a local authority by the Ffaldybrenin Community Council and the church by the parochial church council.

It was the birthplace of Baptist missionary in China, Timothy Richard, (1845–1919).

References

Villages in Carmarthenshire